Mykyta Viktorovych Hrebenshchykov (born 29 March 2004) is a Ukrainian footballer who plays as a defender.

Player career

Yunist Chernihiv
Hrebenshchykov started his youth career with Yunist Chernihiv.

FC Chernihiv
In 2020, Hrebenshchykov signed with FC Chernihiv of the Ukrainian Second League. On 6 october 2021, he made his debut against Livyi Bereh Kyiv. In summer 2022, he terminated his contract with FC Chernihiv by mutual consent.

Career statistics

Club

References

External links
 
 

2004 births
Living people
Footballers from Chernihiv
Association football defenders
FC Yunist Chernihiv players
FC Chernihiv players
Ukrainian footballers
Ukrainian Second League players